Pecten or pectin may refer to:

Pecten

Biology
 Pecten (biology), any comb like structure in animals
 Pecten (bivalve), a genus of scallops
 Pecten (company), a subsidiary of Sinopec
 Pecten oculi, a structure in the bird retina which contains most of the vasculature

Other uses
 Pecten, Alberta, Canada
 Venus comb murex, after its scientific name Murex pecten

Pectin
 Pectin, a plant polysaccharide
 Pectineus muscle, a thigh muscle
 Pectinoidea, a superfamily of bivalve mollusks which includes Pectinidae
 Pectinidae, a family of bivalve mollusks
 Pecten albicans, Japanese baking scallop
 Pecten excavatus
 Pecten sulcicostatus, South African scallop

See also
 Pectineal line (disambiguation)